Globe Derby Park is a suburb of Adelaide, South Australia. It is located in the City of Salisbury.

Demographics

The 2006 Census by the Australian Bureau of Statistics counted 314 persons in Globe Derby Park on census night. Of these, 49.0% were male and 51.0% were female.

The majority of residents (87.3%) are of Australian birth, with another common census response being England (5.4%).

The age distribution of Globe Derby Park residents is skewed towards an older population compared to the greater Australian population.  79.6% of residents were over 25 years in 2006, compared to the Australian average of 66.5%; and 20.4% were younger than 25 years, compared to the Australian average of 33.5%.

By census night 2011, the population had increased to 359 people.

Attractions
The suburb is most notable for the Globe Derby Park harness racing venue after which it was named. The suburb was created in 1998, renaming the southern part of the suburb of Bolivar.

Parks
The Little Para River is on the suburb's northern boundary, with a sealed cycling and walking trail that passes under Port Wakefield Road. The Whites Road Wetland is in Globe Derby Park adjacent to the river and path.

Dry Creek is on the southern boundary of Globe Derby Park. The Little Para Trail loops round the western side of the suburb and joins the Dry Creek linear trail.

Transport

The suburb is serviced by the following main roads:
Port Wakefield Road, part of the National Highway.

See also
List of Adelaide suburbs

References

External links

City of Salisbury
Local Government Association of SA – City of Salisbury
2006 ABS Census Data by Location

Suburbs of Adelaide